Pseudogorgia is a monotypic genus of corals belonging to the monotypic family Pseudogorgiidae. The only species is Pseudogorgia godeffroyi.

The species is found in Southern Australia.

References

Pseudogorgiidae
Octocorallia genera